Auerbachiidae is a family of cnidarians belonging to the order Bivalvulida.

Genera:
 Auerbachia Meglitsch, 1968
 Globospora Lom, Noble & Laird, 1975

References

Variisporina
Cnidarian families